is a passenger railway station in located in the city of Matsusaka, Mie Prefecture, Japan, operated by Central Japan Railway Company (JR Tōkai).

Lines
Gongemmae Station is served by the Meishō Line, and is 7.0 rail kilometers from the terminus of the line at Matsusaka Station.

Station layout
The station consists of a single side platform serving bi-directional traffic. There is no station building, but only a rain shelter built directly on the platform. The station is unattended.

Platforms

Adjacent stations

History 
Gongemmae Station was opened on August 25, 1929, as a station on the Japanese Government Railways (JGR), which became the Japan National Railways (JNR) after World War II. Freight operations were discontinued in 1963. Along with its division and privatization of JNR on April 1, 1987, the station came under the control and operation of the Central Japan Railway Company.

Passenger statistics
In fiscal 2019, the station was used by an average of 33 passengers daily (boarding passengers only).

Surrounding area
former Ureshino Town Hall
Matsusaka City Ureshino Library
Ureshino Social Welfare Center
Ureshino Workers Gymnasium

See also
 List of railway stations in Japan

References

External links

JR Central home page

Railway stations in Japan opened in 1929
Railway stations in Mie Prefecture
Matsusaka, Mie